Immortality (Persian: جاودانگی - Javdanegi) is a 2016 Iranian experimental drama film directed by Mehdi Fard Ghaderi. This movie was recorded entirely on the train. All of the footage takes place on a rainy night using a 145-minute Steadicam one-shot sequence. Immortality was filmed in fourteen nights, and the film was shot twelve times until the end. The final film is one of those twelve takes.

Plot 
All the events of this movie take place on a rainy night on a train and it tells the story of the lives of six families in different train carriages, which is narrated with time shifts.

An old man is informed that he has only three more days to live, he is on a train to go to his cottage and be there when he dies. Slowly his dreams begin.

Cast 

 Manocher Alipour
 Anna Nemati
 Maral Farjad
 Faghiheh Soltani
 Soudabe Beizzaii
 Atabak Naderi
 Alireza Ostadi

Reception 
First premiere Immortality was at the "Rome" Film Festival 2016 in Italy. Italian critics wrote positive reviews about the film. Then this film was then screened at the festival of Munich, Germany and Transylvania, Romania.

Immortality was screened in forty international festivals and received several international festivals from America and Italy.

References 

Iranian drama films
2016 drama films
Films set on trains